The 2022 Winnipeg municipal election took place on October 26, 2022. The offices of mayor, city councillors, and school trustees of the city of Winnipeg were elected as a result of this election. Elections were held as part of municipal elections held across the province. The elections were held under first-past-the-post voting.

Mayoral election 

The incumbent mayor, Brian Bowman, announced on October 23, 2020, that he would not be running for a third term. He said that he was not a career politician, and that he had no plans for a future in politics. Scott Gillingham was elected mayor with just over 27% of the vote.

Candidates

Idris Adelakun 
 Candidacy registered: May 11, 2022
 Campaign website: idrisformayor.com

Rana Bokhari 
 Candidacy registered: May 27, 2022
 Campaign website: ranaforwpg.ca

Chris Clacio 
Candidacy registered: May 1, 2022
Campaign website: christopherclacio.wixsite.com

Scott Gillingham 
Candidacy registered: May 2, 2022
Campaign website: voteforscott.ca

Kevin Klein 
Candidacy registered: July 29, 2022
Campaign website: kevinklein.ca

Shaun Loney 
Candidacy registered: May 4, 2022
Campaign website: shaunforwinnipeg.com

Jenny Motkaluk 
Candidacy registered: May 1, 2022
Campaign website: jennyformayor.ca

Glen Murray 
Candidacy registered: June 22, 2022
Campaign website: glen4wpg.ca

Robert-Falcon Ouellette 
Candidacy registered: May 3, 2022
Campaign website: robertfalcon.ca

Rick Shone 
Candidacy registered: May 2, 2022
Campaign website: rickshone.com

Don Woodstock 
Candidacy registered: May 1, 2022
Campaign website: donwoodstock.com

Opinion polls

Notes

Results

City Councillor elections 
(X) denotes the incumbent.

City Council candidates

References 

Municipal elections in Winnipeg
2022 elections in Canada
2022 in Manitoba
October 2022 events in Canada